Any Way the Wind Blows may refer to:
Any Way the Wind Blows (film), a 2003 film by dEUS' singer-songwriter-director Tom Barman
Any Way the Wind Blows, a 2002 novel by E. Lynn Harris
Any Way the Wind Blows, a 2021 novel by Rainbow Rowell

Music
Any Way the Wind Blows, the fourth volume in the officially released Zappa bootleg box set Beat the Boots
Anyway the Wind Blows: The Anthology, a 1997 compilation album by J. J. Cale
Anyway the Wind Blows, a 1999 album by Bill Wyman's Rhythm Kings
Any Way the Wind Blows (album), 1995 album by Brother Phelps

Songs
"Any Way the Wind Blows" (1958 song), a 1958 song most notably sung by Doris Day
"Any Way the Wind Blows" (Southern Pacific song)
"Any Way the Wind Blows", song by Anaïs Mitchell from Hadestown
"Any Way the Wind Blows", a song by Sara Bareilles from Little Voice
"Any Way the Wind Blows", a song written by Frank Zappa and featured on the album Freak Out! by The Mothers of Invention, released in 1966
"Any Way the Wind Blows", theme song to the popular Tropical Heat series sung by Fred and Larry Mollin
"Anyway the Wind Blows", a song by J. J. Cale from Okie

See also
"Bohemian Rhapsody", a 1975 song by Queen